Laura Hird (born 1966) is a Scottish novelist and short story writer.

Hird studied Contemporary Writing at Middlesex Polytechnic and is the author of two novels, Nail and Other Stories (1997) and Born Free (1999).  Hope and Other Urban Tales, a novella and short story collection, followed in 2006. All her novels and collections are published by Canongate Books. Hird's first novel was published as part of the Rebel Inc. imprint at Canongate, where she also contributed to two anthologies alongside Alan Warner and Irvine Welsh.

Bibliography
 Nail and Other Stories (1997)
 Born Free (1999)
 Hope and Other Urban Tales (2006)
 Dear Laura: Letters from a Mother to her Daughter (2007)

External links

Laura Hird’s Literary Top 10 on Pulp Net
3:AM Interview
Danforth Review Interview

1966 births
Living people
Scottish women novelists
Scottish short story writers
Alumni of Middlesex University
20th-century Scottish novelists
20th-century Scottish women writers
21st-century Scottish writers
21st-century Scottish women writers
British women short story writers
20th-century British short story writers
21st-century British short story writers
21st-century Scottish novelists